Henri Padou Jr. (21 August 1928 – 16 November 1999) was a French freestyle swimmer who competed at the 1948 Summer Olympics. He won a bronze medal in the 4 × 200 m relay and failed to reach the final of the 100 m race.

His father Henri Padou was an Olympic swimmer and water polo player.

References

1928 births
1999 deaths
Sportspeople from Tourcoing
Olympic swimmers of France
Swimmers at the 1948 Summer Olympics
Olympic bronze medalists for France
Olympic bronze medalists in swimming
French male freestyle swimmers
Medalists at the 1948 Summer Olympics
20th-century French people